Blue Velvet is a 1986 American neo-noir mystery thriller film written and directed by David Lynch. Blending psychological horror with film noir, the film stars Kyle MacLachlan, Isabella Rossellini, Dennis Hopper, and Laura Dern, and is named after the 1951 song of the same name. The film concerns a young college student who, returning home to visit his ill father, discovers a severed human ear in a field.  The ear then leads him to uncover a vast criminal conspiracy, and into a romantic relationship with a troubled lounge singer.

The screenplay of Blue Velvet had been passed around multiple times in the late 1970s and early 1980s, with several major studios declining it due to its strong sexual and violent content. After the failure of his 1984 film Dune, Lynch made attempts at developing a more "personal story", somewhat characteristic of the surrealist style displayed in his first film Eraserhead (1977). The independent studio De Laurentiis Entertainment Group, owned at the time by Italian film producer Dino De Laurentiis, agreed to finance and produce the film.

Blue Velvet initially received a divided critical response, with many stating that its explicit content served little artistic purpose. Nevertheless, the film earned Lynch his second nomination for the Academy Award for Best Director, and received the year's Best Film and Best Director prizes from the National Society of Film Critics. It came to achieve cult status. As an example of a director casting against the norm, it was credited for revitalizing Hopper's career and for providing Rossellini with a dramatic outlet beyond her previous work as a fashion model and a cosmetics spokeswoman. In the years since, the film has been re-evaluated, and it is now widely regarded as one of Lynch's major works and one of the greatest films of the 1980s. Publications including Sight & Sound, Time, Entertainment Weekly and BBC Magazine have ranked it among the greatest American films ever. In 2008, it was chosen by the American Film Institute as one of the greatest mystery films ever made.

Plot

College student Jeffrey Beaumont returns to his hometown of Lumberton, North Carolina after his father, Tom, has a near-fatal attack from a medical condition that is never directly stated.  Jeffrey's father is confined in a bed and with some manner of constricting device, suggesting a seizure disorder. Walking home from the hospital, Jeffrey cuts through a vacant lot and discovers a severed human ear, which he takes to police detective John Williams. Williams' daughter Sandy tells Jeffrey that the ear somehow relates to a lounge singer named Dorothy Vallens. Intrigued, Jeffrey, posing as a pest exterminator, accesses her apartment. While there, he steals a spare key while she is distracted by a man in a distinctive yellow sport coat, whom Jeffrey nicknames the "Yellow Man."

Jeffrey and Sandy attend Dorothy's nightclub act, in which she sings "Blue Velvet," and leave early so Jeffrey can infiltrate her apartment. Dorothy returns home, stripping naked, but when she hears Jeffrey, she finds him hiding in a closet and forces him to undress at knifepoint. She nearly fellates Jeffrey, but he retreats to the closet when Frank Booth, an aggressively psychopathic gangster and drug lord, arrives and interrupts their encounter. Frank then proceeds to beat and rape Dorothy while inhaling narcotic gas from a canister and alternating between fits of sobbing and violent rage. After Frank leaves, Jeffrey sneaks away and seeks comfort from Sandy.

After surmising that Frank has abducted Dorothy's husband, Don, and son, Donnie, to force her into sex slavery, Jeffrey suspects Frank cut off Don's ear to intimidate her into submission. While continuing to see Sandy, Jeffrey enters into a sadomasochistic sexual relationship in which Dorothy encourages him to hit her. Jeffrey sees Frank attending Dorothy's show and later observes him selling drugs and meeting with the Yellow Man. Jeffrey then sees the Yellow Man meeting with a "well-dressed man."

When Frank catches Jeffrey leaving Dorothy's apartment, he abducts them and takes them to the lair of Ben, a criminal associate holding both Don and Donnie hostage. Frank permits Dorothy to see her family and forces Jeffrey to watch Ben perform an impromptu lip-sync of Roy Orbison's "In Dreams", which moves Frank to tears. Afterwards, he and his gang take Jeffrey and Dorothy on a high-speed joyride to a sawmill yard, where he reattempts to sexually abuse Dorothy. When Jeffrey intervenes and punches him in the face, an enraged Frank and his gang pull him out of the car. Replaying the tape of "In Dreams", Frank smears lipstick on his face and violently kisses Jeffrey, likewise smearing him with red lipstick, before savagely beating him unconscious, while Dorothy pleads for Frank to stop. Jeffrey awakes the next morning, bruised and bloodied.

Visiting the police station, Jeffrey discovers that Detective Williams' partner, Tom Gordon, is the Yellow Man, who has been murdering Frank's rival drug dealers and stealing confiscated narcotics from the evidence room for Frank to sell. After he and Sandy declare their love for each other at a party, they are pursued by a car which they assume belongs to Frank. As they arrive at Jeffrey's home, Sandy realizes the driver is her ex-boyfriend, Mike. After Mike threatens to beat Jeffrey for stealing his girlfriend, Dorothy appears on Jeffrey's porch naked, beaten, and confused. Mike backs down as Jeffrey and Sandy whisk Dorothy to Sandy's house to summon medical attention.

When Dorothy calls Jeffrey "my secret lover," a distraught Sandy slaps him for cheating on her. Jeffrey asks Sandy to tell her father everything, and Detective Williams then leads a police raid on Frank's headquarters, killing his men and crippling his criminal empire. Jeffrey returns alone to Dorothy's apartment, where he discovers her husband dead and the Yellow Man mortally wounded. As Jeffrey leaves the apartment, the "Well-Dressed Man" arrives, sees Jeffrey in the stairs, and chases him back inside. Jeffrey, realizing that the "Well Dressed Man" is actually Frank Booth, uses the Yellow Man's walkie-talkie to say he is in the bedroom before hiding in a closet. When Frank arrives, Jeffrey ambushes and kills him with the Yellow Man's gun, moments before Sandy and Detective Williams arrive to help.

Jeffrey and Sandy continue their relationship and Dorothy is reunited with her son.

Cast

Production

Origin

The film's story originated from three ideas that crystallized in the filmmaker's mind over a period of time starting as early as 1973.

The first idea was only "a feeling" and the title Blue Velvet, Lynch told Cineaste in 1987.

The second idea was an image of a severed, human ear lying in a field. "I don't know why it had to be an ear. Except it needed to be an opening of a part of the body, a hole into something else ... The ear sits on the head and goes right into the mind so it felt perfect," Lynch remarked in a 1986 interview to The New York Times.

The third idea was Bobby Vinton's classic rendition of the song "Blue Velvet" and "the mood that came with that song a mood, a time, and things that were of that time."

The scene in which Dorothy appears naked outside was inspired by a real-life experience Lynch had during childhood when he and his brother saw a naked woman walking down a neighborhood street at night. The experience was so traumatic to the young Lynch that it made him cry, and he had never forgotten it.

After completing The Elephant Man (1980), Lynch met producer Richard Roth over coffee. Roth had read and enjoyed Lynch's Ronnie Rocket script, but did not think it was something he wanted to produce. He asked Lynch if the filmmaker had any other scripts, but the director only had ideas. "I told him I had always wanted to sneak into a girl's room to watch her into the night and that, maybe, at one point or another, I would see something that would be the clue to a murder mystery. Roth loved the idea and asked me to write a treatment. I went home and thought of the ear in the field." Production was announced in August 1984. Lynch wrote two more drafts before he was satisfied with the script of the film. The problem with them, Lynch has said, was that "there was maybe all the unpleasantness in the film but nothing else. A lot was not there. And so it went away for a while." Conditions at this point were ideal for Lynch's film: he had made a deal with Dino De Laurentiis that gave him complete artistic freedom and final cut privileges, with the stipulation that the filmmaker take a cut in his salary and work with a budget of only $6 million. This deal meant that Blue Velvet was the smallest film on De Laurentiis's slate. Consequently, Lynch would be left mostly unsupervised during production. "After Dune I was down so far that anything was up! So it was just a euphoria. And when you work with that kind of feeling, you can take chances. You can experiment."

Casting
The cast of Blue Velvet included several then-relatively unknown actors.

Lynch met Isabella Rossellini at a restaurant, and offered her the role of Dorothy Vallens. Rossellini had gained some exposure before the film for her Lancôme ads in the early 1980s and for being the daughter of actress Ingrid Bergman and Italian film director Roberto Rossellini. After completion of the film, during test screenings, ICM Partners—the agency representing Rossellini—immediately dropped her as a client. Furthermore, the nuns at the school in Rome that Rossellini attended in her youth called to say they were praying for her.

Kyle MacLachlan had played the central role in Lynch's critical and commercial failure Dune (1984), a science fiction epic based on the novel of the same name. MacLachlan later became a recurring collaborator with Lynch, who remarked: "Kyle plays innocents who are interested in the mysteries of life. He's the person you trust enough to go into a strange world with."

Dennis Hopper was the biggest "name" in the film, having starred in Easy Rider (1969). Hopper—said to be Lynch's third choice (Michael Ironside has stated that Frank was written with him in mind)—accepted the role, reportedly having exclaimed, "I've got to play Frank! I am Frank!" as Hopper confirmed in the Blue Velvet "making-of" documentary The Mysteries of Love, produced for the 2002 special edition. Harry Dean Stanton and Steven Berkoff both turned down the role of Frank because of the violent content in the film.

Laura Dern (then 18 years old) was cast, after various already successful actresses had turned it down; among these had been Molly Ringwald.

Shooting
Principal photography of Blue Velvet began in August 1985 and completed in November. The film was shot at EUE/Screen Gems studio in Wilmington, North Carolina, which also provided the exterior scenes of Lumberton. The scene with a raped and battered Dorothy proved to be particularly challenging. Several townspeople arrived to watch the filming with picnic baskets and rugs, against the wishes of Rossellini and Lynch. However, they continued filming as normal, and when Lynch yelled cut, the townspeople had left. As a result, police told Lynch they were no longer permitted to shoot in any public areas of Wilmington.

The Carolina Apartments on 5th and Market St in downtown Wilmington served as the location central to the story, with the adjacent Kenan fountain featured prominently in many shots. The building is also the birthplace and deathplace of noted artist Claude Howell. The apartment building stands today, and the Kenan fountain was refurbished in 2020 after sustaining heavy damage during Hurricane Florence.

Editing
Lynch's original rough cut ran for approximately four hours. He was contractually obligated to deliver a two-hour movie by De Laurentiis and cut many small subplots and character scenes. He also made cuts at the request of the MPAA. For example, when Frank slaps Dorothy after the first rape scene, the audience was supposed to see Frank actually hitting her. Instead, the film cuts away to Jeffrey in the closet, wincing at what he has just seen. This cut was made to satisfy the MPAA's concerns about violence. Lynch thought that the change only made the scene more disturbing. In 2011, Lynch announced that footage from the deleted scenes, long thought lost, had been discovered. The material was subsequently included on the Blu-ray Disc release of the film. The final cut of the film runs at just over two hours.

Distribution
Because the material was completely different from anything that would be considered mainstream at the time, De Laurentiis Entertainment Group's marketing employees were unsure of how to promote the film, or even if it would be promoted at all; it wasn't until the positive reception the film received at various film festivals that they began to promote it.

Interpretations

Despite Blue Velvets initial appearance as a mystery, the film operates on a number of thematic levels. The film owes a large debt to 1950s film noir, containing and exploring such conventions as the femme fatale (Dorothy Vallens), a seemingly unstoppable villain (Frank Booth), and the questionable moral outlook of the hero (Jeffrey Beaumont), as well as its unusual use of shadowy, sometimes dark cinematography. Blue Velvet represents and establishes Lynch's famous "askew vision", and introduces several common elements of Lynch's work, some of which would later become his trademarks, including distorted characters, a polarized world, and debilitating damage to the skull or brain. Perhaps the most significant Lynchian trademark in the film is the depiction of unearthing a dark underbelly in a seemingly idealized small town; Jeffrey even proclaims in the film that he is "seeing something that was always hidden", alluding to the plot's central idea. Lynch's characterization of films, symbols, and motifs have become well known, and his particular style, characterised largely in Blue Velvet for the first time, has been written about extensively using descriptions like "dreamlike", "ultraweird", "dark", and "oddball". Red curtains also show up in key scenes, specifically in Dorothy's apartment, which have since become a Lynch trademark. The film has been compared to Alfred Hitchcock's Psycho (1960) because of its stark treatment of evil and mental illness. The premise of both films is curiosity, leading to an investigation that draws the lead characters into a hidden, voyeuristic underworld of crime.

The film's thematic framework hearkens back to Edgar Allan Poe, Henry James, and early gothic fiction, as well as films such as Shadow of a Doubt (1943) and The Night of the Hunter (1955) and the entire notion of film noir. Lynch has called it a "film about things that are hidden—within a small city and within people."

Feminist psychoanalytic film theorist Laura Mulvey argues that Blue Velvet establishes a metaphorical Oedipal family—"the child", Jeffrey Beaumont, and his "parents", Frank Booth and Dorothy Vallens—through deliberate references to film noir and its underlying Oedipal theme. Michael Atkinson claims that the resulting violence in the film can be read as symbolic of domestic violence within real families. For instance, Frank's violent acts can be seen to reflect the different types of abuse within families, and the control he has over Dorothy might represent the hold an abusive husband has over his wife. He reads Jeffrey as an innocent youth who is both horrified by the violence inflicted by Frank, but also tempted by it as the means of possessing Dorothy for himself. Atkinson takes a Freudian approach to the film; considering it to be an expression of the traumatised innocence which characterises Lynch's work. He states, "Dorothy represents the sexual force of the mother [figure] because she is forbidden and because she becomes the object of the unhealthy, infantile impulses at work in Jeffrey's subconscious."

Symbolism
Symbolism is used heavily in Blue Velvet. The most consistent symbolism in the film is an insect motif introduced at the end of the first scene, when the camera zooms in on a well-kept suburban lawn until it unearths a swarming underground nest of bugs. This is generally recognized as a metaphor for the seedy underworld that Jeffrey will soon discover under the surface of his own suburban, Reaganesque paradise. The severed ear he finds is being overrun by black ants. The bug motif is recurrent throughout the film, most notably in the bug-like gas mask that Frank wears, but also the excuse that Jeffrey uses to gain access to Dorothy's apartment: he claims to be an insect exterminator. One of Frank's sinister accomplices is also consistently identified through the yellow jacket he wears, possibly reminiscent of the name of a type of wasp. Finally, a robin eating a bug on a fence becomes a topic of discussion in the last scene of the film.

The severed ear that Jeffrey discovers is also a key symbolic element, leading Jeffrey into danger. Indeed, just as Jeffrey's troubles begin, the audience is treated to a nightmarish sequence in which the camera zooms into the canal of the severed, decomposing ear.

Soundtrack

The Blue Velvet soundtrack was supervised by Angelo Badalamenti (who makes a brief cameo appearance as the pianist at the Slow Club where Dorothy performs). The soundtrack makes heavy usage of vintage pop songs, such as Bobby Vinton's "Blue Velvet" and Roy Orbison's "In Dreams", juxtaposed with an orchestral score inspired by Shostakovich. During filming, Lynch placed speakers on set and in streets and played Shostakovich to set the mood he wanted to convey. The score alludes to Shostakovich's 15th Symphony, which Lynch had been listening to regularly while writing the screenplay. Lynch had originally opted to use "Song to the Siren" by This Mortal Coil during the scene in which Sandy and Jeffrey share a dance; however, he could not obtain the rights for the song at the time. He would go on to use this song in Lost Highway, eleven years later.

Entertainment Weekly ranked Blue Velvet soundtrack on its list of the 100 Greatest Film Soundtracks, at the 100th position. Critic John Alexander wrote, "the haunting soundtrack accompanies the title credits, then weaves through the narrative, accentuating the noir mood of the film." Lynch worked with music composer Angelo Badalamenti for the first time in this film and asked him to write a score that had to be "like Shostakovich, be very Russian, but make it the most beautiful thing but make it dark and a little bit scary." Badalamenti's success with Blue Velvet would lead him to contribute to all of Lynch's future full-length films until Inland Empire as well as the cult television program Twin Peaks. Also included in the sound team was long-time Lynch collaborator Alan Splet, a sound editor and designer who had won an Academy Award for his work on The Black Stallion (1979), and been nominated for Never Cry Wolf (1983).

Reception

Box office
Blue Velvet premiered in competition at the Montréal World Film Festival in August 1986, and at the Toronto Festival of Festivals on September 12, 1986, and a few days later in the United States. It debuted commercially in both countries on September 19, 1986, in 98 theatres across the United States. In its opening weekend, the film grossed a total of $789,409. It eventually expanded to another 15 theatres, and in the US and Canada grossed a total of $8,551,228. Blue Velvet was met with uproar during its audience reception, with lines formed around city blocks in New York City and Los Angeles. There were reports of mass walkouts and refund demands during its opening week. At a Chicago screening, a man fainted and had to have his pacemaker checked. Upon completion, he returned to the cinema to see the ending. At a Los Angeles cinema, two strangers became engaged in a heated disagreement, but decided to resolve the disagreement to return to the theatre.

Critical reception
Blue Velvet was released to a mixed reception in the United States. The critics who did praise the film were often vociferous. The New York Times critic Janet Maslin directed much praise toward the performances of Hopper and Rossellini: "Mr. Hopper and Miss Rossellini are so far outside the bounds of ordinary acting here that their performances are best understood in terms of sheer lack of inhibition; both give themselves entirely over to the material, which seems to be exactly what's called for." She called it "an instant cult classic". Maslin concluded by saying that Blue Velvet "is as fascinating as it is freakish. It confirms Mr. Lynch's stature as an innovator, a superb technician, and someone best not encountered in a dark alley."

Sheila Benson of the Los Angeles Times called the film "the most brilliantly disturbing film ever to have its roots in small-town American life," describing it as "shocking, visionary, rapturously controlled". Film critic Gene Siskel included Blue Velvet on his list of the best films of 1986, at the fifth spot. Peter Travers, film critic for Rolling Stone, named it the best film of the 1980s and referred to it as an "American masterpiece". Upon its initial release, Woody Allen and Martin Scorsese called Blue Velvet the "Best Film of The Year".

On the other hand, Paul Attanasio of The Washington Post said "the film showcases a visual stylist utterly in command of his talents" and that Angelo Badalamenti "contributes an extraordinary score, slipping seamlessly from slinky jazz to violin figures to the romantic sweep of a classic Hollywood score," but stated that Lynch "isn't interested in communicating, he's interested in parading his personality. The movie doesn't progress or deepen, it just gets weirder, and to no good end." A general criticism from US critics was Blue Velvets approach to sexuality and violence. They asserted that this detracted from the film's seriousness as a work of art, and some condemned the film as pornographic. One of its detractors, Roger Ebert, praised Isabella Rossellini's performance as "convincing and courageous" but criticized how she was depicted in the film, even accusing David Lynch of misogyny: "degraded, slapped around, humiliated and undressed in front of the camera. And when you ask an actress to endure those experiences, you should keep your side of the bargain by putting her in an important film." While Ebert in later years came to consider Lynch a great filmmaker, his negative view of Blue Velvet remained unchanged after he revisited it in the 21st century.

The film is now widely considered a masterpiece and has a score of 95% on Rotten Tomatoes based on 80 reviews with an average rating of 8.8/10. The website's critical consensus states: "If audiences walk away from this subversive, surreal shocker not fully understanding the story, they might also walk away with a deeper perception of the potential of film storytelling." The film also has a score of 76 out of 100 on Metacritic based on 15 critics, indicating "generally favorable reviews". Looking back in his Guardian/Observer review, critic Philip French wrote, "The film is wearing well and has attained a classic status without becoming respectable or losing its sense of danger."

Mark Kermode walked out on the film and gave the film a poor review upon its release, but revised his view of the film over time. In 2016, he remarked, "as a film critic, it taught me that when a film really gets under your skin and really provokes a visceral reaction, you have to be very careful about assessing it ... I didn't walk out on Blue Velvet because it was a bad film. I walked out on it because it was a really good film. The point was at the time I wasn't good enough for it."

Accolades

Lynch was nominated for a Best Director Oscar for the film. Dennis Hopper was nominated for a Golden Globe for his performance. Isabella Rossellini won an Independent Spirit Award for the Best Female Lead in 1987. David Lynch and Dennis Hopper won a Los Angeles Film Critics Association award in 1987 for Blue Velvet in categories Best Director (Lynch) and Best Supporting Actor (Hopper). In 1987, National Society of Film Critics awarded Best Film, Best Director (David Lynch), Best Cinematography (Frederick Elmes), and Best Supporting Actor (Dennis Hopper) awards.

Home media
Blue Velvet was released on VHS by Karl-Lorimar Home Video in 1987 and re-issued by Warner Home Video in 1992. After that, it was DVD in 1999 and 2002 by MGM Home Entertainment. The film made its Blu-ray debut on November 8, 2011, with a special 25th-anniversary edition featuring never-before-seen deleted scenes. On May 28, 2019, the film was re-released on Blu-ray by the Criterion Collection, featuring a 4K digital restoration, the original stereo soundtrack and other special features, including a behind-the-scenes documentary titled Blue Velvet Revisited.

Legacy

Although it initially gained a relatively small theatrical audience in North America and was met with controversy over its artistic merit, Blue Velvet soon became the center of a "national firestorm" in 1986, and over time became an American classic. In the late 1980s, and early 1990s, after its release on videotape, the film became a widely recognized cult film, for its dark depiction of a suburban America. With its many VHS, LaserDisc and DVD releases, the film reached broader American audiences. It marked David Lynch's entry into the Hollywood mainstream and Dennis Hopper's comeback. Hopper's performance as Frank Booth has itself left an imprint on popular culture, with countless tributes, cultural references and parodies. The film's success also helped Hollywood address previously censored issues, as Psycho (1960) had. Blue Velvet has been frequently compared to that ground-breaking film. It has become one of the most significant, well-recognized films of its era, spawning countless imitations and parodies in media. The film's dark, stylish and erotic production design has served as a benchmark for a number of films, parodies and even Lynch's own later work, notably Twin Peaks (1990–91), and Mulholland Drive (2001). Peter Travers of Rolling Stone magazine cited it as one of the most "influential American films", as did Michael Atkinson, who dedicated a book to the film's themes and motifs.

Blue Velvet now frequently appears in various critical assessments of all-time great films, also ranked as one of the greatest films of the 1980s, one of the best examples of American surrealism and one of the finest examples of David Lynch's work. In a poll of 54 American critics ranking the "most outstanding films of the decade", Blue Velvet was placed fourth, behind Raging Bull (1980), E.T. the Extra-Terrestrial (1982) and the German film Wings of Desire (1987). An Entertainment Weekly book special released in 1999 ranked Blue Velvet 37th of the greatest films of all time. The film was ranked by The Guardian in its list of the 100 Greatest Films. Film Four ranked it on their list of 100 Greatest Films. In a 2007 poll of the online film community held by Variety, Blue Velvet came in at the 95th-greatest film of all time. Total Film ranked Blue Velvet as one of the all-time best films in both a critics' list and a public poll, in 2006 and 2007, respectively. In December 2002, a UK film critics' poll in Sight & Sound ranked the film fifth on their list of the 10 Best Films of the Last 25 Years. In a special Entertainment Weekly issue, 100 new film classics were chosen from 1983 to 2008: Blue Velvet was ranked at fourth.

In addition to Blue Velvet various "all-time greatest films" rankings, the American Film Institute has awarded the film three honors in its lists: 96th on 100 Years ... 100 Thrills in 2001, selecting cinema's most thrilling moments and ranked Frank Booth 36th of the 50 greatest villains in 100 Years ... 100 Heroes and Villains in 2003. In June 2008, the AFI revealed its "ten Top Ten"—the best ten films in ten "classic" American film genres—after polling over 1,500 people from the creative community. Blue Velvet was acknowledged as the eighth best film in the mystery genre. Premiere magazine listed Frank Booth, played by Dennis Hopper, as the 54th on its list of 'The 100 Greatest Movie Characters of All Time', calling him one of "the most monstrously funny creations in cinema history". The film was ranked 84th on Bravo Television's four-hour program 100 Scariest Movie Moments (2004). It is frequently sampled musically and an array of bands and solo artists have taken their names and inspiration from the film. In August 2012, Sight & Sound unveiled their latest list of the 250 greatest films of all time, with Blue Velvet ranking at 69th.

Blue Velvet was also nominated for the following AFI lists:
 AFI's 100 Years...100 Movies
 AFI's 100 Years...100 Heroes & Villains
 Frank Booth – Ranked 36th-greatest film villain.
 AFI's 100 Years...100 Songs:
 "In Dreams" - nominated song.
 AFI's 100 Years...100 Movies (10th Anniversary Edition)

Inspired by the film, pop singer Lana Del Rey recorded a cover version of Bobby Vinton's classic rendition of the song "Blue Velvet" in 2012. Used to endorse clothing line H&M, a music video accompanied the track and aired as a television commercial. Filmed in post-war America, the video drew influence from Lynch and Blue Velvet. In the video, Del Rey plays the role of Dorothy Vallens, performing a private concert similar to the scene where Ben (Dean Stockwell) pantomimes "In Dreams" for Frank Booth. Del Rey's version, however, has her lip-syncing "Blue Velvet" when a little person dressed as Frank Sinatra approaches and unplugs a hidden Victrola, revealing Del Rey as a fraud. When Lynch heard of the music video, he praised it, telling Artinfo: "Lana Del Rey, she's got some fantastic charisma and—this is a very interesting thing—it's like she's born out of another time. She's got something that's very appealing to people. And I didn't know she was influenced by me!"

"Now It's Dark", a song by American heavy metal band Anthrax on their 1988 album State of Euphoria, was directly inspired by the film, and specifically the character of Frank Booth. The same phrase appeared in the liner notes of Rush's album Roll the Bones, and drummer Neil Peart later explained: "The phrase occurs in David Lynch's comedy classic Blue Velvet."

The sludge metal band Acid Bath sampled the movie on the song "Cassie Eats Cockroaches" from their first album When the Kite String Pops and industrial metal band Ministry sampled the movie in their song "Jesus Built My Hotrod".

References

Further reading
 Atkinson, Michael (1997). Blue Velvet. Long Island, New York.: British Film Institute. .
 Drazin, Charles (2001). Blue Velvet: Bloomsbury Pocket Movie Guide 3. Britain. Bloomsbury Publishing. .
 Lynch, David and Rodley, Chris (2005). Lynch on Lynch. Faber and Faber: New York. .

External links

 
 
 

1986 films
1980s crime thriller films
1986 independent films
1980s mystery thriller films
1980s psychological thriller films
American crime thriller films
American independent films
American mystery thriller films
American psychological thriller films
BDSM in films
De Laurentiis Entertainment Group films
1980s English-language films
Erotic mystery films
Films about violence against women
Films directed by David Lynch
Films scored by Angelo Badalamenti
Films set in North Carolina
Films shot in North Carolina
American neo-noir films
Postmodern films
Films with screenplays by David Lynch
National Society of Film Critics Award for Best Film winners
1980s American films